The 30th Alberta Legislative Assembly was constituted after the general election on April 16, 2019. The United Conservative Party (UCP), led by Jason Kenney, won a majority of seats and formed the government. The New Democrats, led by outgoing Premier Rachel Notley, won the second most seats and formed the official opposition. The premiership of Jason Kenney began on April 30, 2019, when Jason Kenney and his first cabinet were sworn in by Lieutenant Governor of Alberta, Lois Mitchell. On October 11, 2022, Kenney resigned, and Danielle Smith, the new leader of the UCP, was sworn in as premier by Lieutenant Governor Salma Lakhani.

First session
Among the legislation adopted during the first session of the 30th Legislature, An Act to Repeal the Carbon Tax (Bill 1) repealed the Climate Leadership Act and its carbon levy, Bill 2 amended the Employment Standards Code and the Labour Relations Code to change how overtime hours are calculated from time-and-a-half to straight time, reduced the minimum wage for workers aged 13 to 17 to $13 an hour (from $15 an hour) and changed rules for union certification processes, Bill 26 exempted the Labour Relations Code from applying to farming or ranching employees and exempted farms with less than five employees from the Employment Standards Code and the requirement to hold workplace insurance, Bill 8 replaced the School Act with the Education Act which, among other changes, included eliminating of certain protections of gay–straight alliances and eliminating the restriction on the number of charter schools that are permitted, and Bills 7 and 29 amended the Municipal Government Act to allow individual municipalities to offer tax deferrals or exemptions for the purpose of encouraging the development of non-residential properties. Bill 19 renamed the Climate Change and Emissions Management Act to the Emissions Management and Climate Resilience Act and established new rules for targets, prices and credits applicable to industrial emitters. Bill 22 was an omnibus bill that amended, repealed or enacted numerous acts and included the transferring of the Alberta Teachers' Retirement Fund and funds invested by the Workers Compensation Board to the Alberta Investment Management Corporation, dissolving the Office of the Election Commissioner and the Alberta Historical Resources Foundation, repealing the Alberta Sport Connection Act, Social Care Facilities Review Committee Act, the Alberta Competitiveness Act, and the Alberta Capital Finance Authority Act while enacting the Local Authorities Capital Financing Act. Bill 25, among other measures aimed at red tape reduction, repealed the Developmental Disabilities Foundation Act and the Small Power Research and Development Act, as well as dissolved the Health Professions Advisory Board, created provisions to allow digital signature to give consent for organ donation, and provided greater flexibility for the Glenbow Museum to loan out its collection.

Among financial measures, Bill 3 lowered the province's corporate tax rate from 12% to 8%, and Bill 12 created a 10-year freeze on oil and gas royalty rates for newly drilled wells. Legislative measures arising from the 2019 Alberta budget were implemented in Bills 20 and 21. Bill 20 repealed Edmonton's and Calgary's City Charters Fiscal Framework Act and replaced it with the new Local Government Fiscal Framework Act and the Public Transit and Green Infrastructure Project Act; repealed the Interactive Digital Media Tax Credit Act and replaced it with the Film and Television Tax Credit Act; repealed the Access to the Future Act regarding advanced education, the Alberta Cancer Prevention Legacy Act regarding cancer prevention, and the Investing in a Diversified Alberta Economy Act regarding tax credits for investment in small non-oil/gas-related businesses; eliminated the Environmental Protection and Enhancement Fund which was a security deposit fund for land reclamation resulting from industrial activities, and the Lottery Fund which had re-direct gaming revenue to charities; and raised tobacco taxes. Bill 21, among other measures, ended the province tuition freeze, increased student loan interest rates by 1%, ended indexation of the bottom tax bracket and of the Assured Income for the Severely Handicapped, and allows replacement workers to be used in the public sector.

In addition to the Public Sector Wage Arbitration Deferral Act (Bill 9), new acts that were created included the Red Tape Reduction Act (Bill 4) to require reports on government initiatives to prevent unnecessary regulatory and administrative requirements. The Fair Registration Practices Act (Bill 11) established the Fair Registration Practices Office to facilitate the use of foreign credentials within professional organizations, and the Alberta Indigenous Opportunities Corporation Act (Bill 14) established the Alberta Indigenous Opportunities Corporation to facilitate investment by indigenous groups in natural resource projects. The Opioid Damages and Health Care Costs Recovery Act (Bill 28) allowed Alberta to join British Columbia's class-action lawsuit against opioid manufacturers.

Private member's bills
Two Private member's bills were passed by the Alberta Legislature during the first session. United Conservative Party MLA Jackie Armstrong-Homeniuk's Protection of Students with Life-threatening Allergies Act (Bill 201) requires all publicly funded schools to have adrenalin autoinjectors (EpiPens) at the ready, should someone have an unexpected, life-threatening allergic reaction. Bill 201 received Royal Assent on June 28, 2019, and came into force on January 1, 2020.

UCP MLA Mike Ellis' Child, Youth and Family Enhancement (Protecting Alberta's Children) Amendment Act, 2019 (Bill 202, also known as Serenity's Law) built onto the previous legislated requirement for adults to report child abuse to a child welfare director, allowing an individual to report abuse to police and increasing the fines for failure to report from $2,000 to $10,000. The bill was proposed in response to the 2014 death of a four year old named Serenity who died after falling from a tire swing in Maskwacis, and a subsequent panel to investigate the province's child intervention system. Bill 202 received Royal Assent and came into force on October 30, 2019.

Second session
The second session opened on February 25, 2020, with no changes to the Executive Council of Alberta. The session would soon be interrupted by the COVID-19 pandemic in Alberta and numerous health and COVID-related legislation would be adopted. Addressing the pandemic, the Tenancies Statutes (Emergency Provisions) Amendment Act, 2020 (Bill 11) and Commercial Tenancies Protection Act (Bill 23) prohibited residential and commercial evictions and rent increases; Public Health (Emergency Powers) Amendment Act, 2020 (Bill 10) and COVID-19 Pandemic Response Statutes Amendment Act, 2020 (Bill 24) gave any minister in the Executive Council the ability to make a law outside of the legislature (though this would be repealed in Bill 66), expanded certain powers held by the Minister of Health and the Chief Medical Officer to apply beyond public health emergencies, created a right to unpaid COVID-related leave for employees; Emergency Management Amendment Act, 2020 (No. 2) (Bill 13) created new offences related to price fixing, travel, and refusing to render expert aid or be conscripted during a state of emergency; Utility Payment Deferral Program Act (Bill 14) created an electricity and natural gas Utility Payment Deferral Program; Bill 70 provided liability protection to long-term care and supportive-living facilities and their employees; and Bill 71 inserted "COVID-19 Vaccination Leave" into the Employment Standards. Other health-related legislation included the Health Statutes Amendment Act, 2020 (Bill 30) that created regulations to allow for-profit corporations to charge the province for health services and conduct surgeries in private clinics, as well as bring the Health Quality Council under the direction of the Minister of Health. Bill 17 was adopted as the government's response to JH v Alberta Health Services that found several sections of the Mental Health Act to be unconstitutional. Bill 19 renamed the Tobacco and Smoking Reduction Act to the Tobacco, Smoking and Vaping Reduction Act and inserted new regulations to address vaping.

New acts created during the second session included the Critical Infrastructure Defence Act (Bill 1) which creates a definition of "essential infrastructure" and increases penalties for related trespassing and vandalism including warrantless arrests; the Protecting Survivors of Human Trafficking Act (Bill 8) which allows a court to issue a Human Trafficking Protection Order with conditions to protect victims; the Provincial Administrative Penalties Act (Bill 21) created SafeRoads AB and the Immediate Roadside Sanction program to administer penalties for impaired driving, rather than the court system; the Alberta Investment Attraction Act (Bill 33) created the Invest Alberta Corporation to promote investment activities; the Geothermal Resource Development Act (Bill 36) and the Mineral Resource Development Act (Bill 82) to expand the jurisdiction of the Alberta Energy Regulator to include geothermal-related activities and the mining of certain metals and minerals. the Financing Alberta's Strategic Transportation Act (Bill 43) to allow tolls to be used on roads and bridges; the Citizen Initiative Act (Bill 51) and Recall Act (Bill 52) to create mechanisms for citizens to petition for an initiative or recall election; the Freedom to Care Act (Bill 58) to create liability protection and regulatory exemptions that apply to volunteers doing unpaid work for non-profits; the Captive Insurance Companies Act (Bill 76) to legalize captive insurance and; the Trails Act (Bill 79) to regulate recreational trails on public lands.

Fiscal Measures and Taxation Act, 2020 (Bill 5) implemented the legislative amendments resulting from the 2020 budget, including extending the province's tourism levy to short-term rentals booked through online platforms. Bill 22 was an omnibus bill that addressed numerous topics aimed at "red tape reduction" and, among other items, repealed the Recreation Development Act, dissolved  Energy Efficiency Alberta, and removed the restrictions that members of corporate or non-profit boards  of directors, as well as applicants for grazing dispositions on public lands, be residents of Alberta. Bill 25 requires scrap metal dealers to report transactions of certain metals to police. Bill 2 ended prohibition in Cardston and Warner Counties. Bill 18 created the Alberta Parole Board to take over the responsibilities of the Parole Board of Canada while Bill 16 expanded the mandate of the Victims of Crime Fund to also include funding for initiatives that promote public safety. Bill 12 allows the Orphan Well Association to operate abandoned wells and pipelines. Concerning future elections, Bill 26 expanded the scope of what a provincial referendum can consider and increased the spending limits of third-party advertisers, while Bill 29 increased donation limits applicable to local government elections, extended the deadline for donation disclosure statements until after the election has occurred, and required unspent campaign funds be donated to a charity.

Members of the 30th Assembly

Seating plan

By-elections

Notes and References

Alberta Legislature
Terms of the Alberta Legislature
2019 in Alberta
2020 in Alberta
2019 in Canadian politics
2020 in Canadian politics